Varnado is a village in Washington Parish, Louisiana, United States. The population was 1,461 at the 2010 census. It is part of the Bogalusa Micropolitan Statistical Area.

Geography
Varnado is located at  (30.894911, -89.831635).

Demographics

As of the census of 2000, there were 342 people, 144 households, and 86 families residing in the village. The racial makeup of the village was 88.60% White, 9.36% African American, 0.58% Native American, and 1.46% from two or more races.

There were 144 households, out of which 27.1% had children under the age of 18 living with them, 41.0% were married couples living together, 16.7% had a female householder with no husband present, and 39.6% were non-families. 34.7% of all households were made up of individuals, and 13.2% had someone living alone who was 65 years of age or older. The average household size was 2.38 and the average family size was 3.15.

In the village, the population was spread out, with 24.9% under the age of 18, 12.0% from 18 to 24, 26.9% from 25 to 44, 22.8% from 45 to 64, and 13.5% who were 65 years of age or older. The median age was 38 years. For every 100 females, there were 74.5 males. For every 100 females age 18 and over, there were 73.6 males.

The median income for a household in the village was $26,563, and the median income for a family was $30,909. Males had a median income of $30,938 versus $21,000 for females. The per capita income for the village was $14,416. About 21.4% of families and 19.5% of the population were below the poverty line, including 23.4% of those under age 18 and 9.1% of those age 65 or over.

References

Villages in Louisiana
Villages in Washington Parish, Louisiana